Luis Miguel Santillana Fraile (born 13 August 1951) is a Spanish basketball player. He competed in the men's tournament at the 1972 Summer Olympics and the 1980 Summer Olympics.

References

External links
 

1951 births
Living people
Basketball players at the 1972 Summer Olympics
Basketball players at the 1980 Summer Olympics
FC Barcelona Bàsquet players
Joventut Badalona players
Liga ACB players
Olympic basketball players of Spain
Spanish men's basketball players
1974 FIBA World Championship players
Basketball players from Barcelona
Centers (basketball)